The following is an incomplete list of Egyptian films before 1930. For an A-Z list of films currently on Wikipedia, please see :Category:Egyptian films.

1920s

External links
 Egyptian film at the Internet Movie Database

1920s
Films
Egyptian

ar:أفلام مصرية